Pedro Jesús Aquino Sánchez (born 13 April 1995) is a Peruvian professional footballer who plays as a defensive midfielder for Liga MX club América and the Peru national team.

Club career

Sporting Cristal
He made his senior league debut for Sporting Cristal on 2 June 2013 in a Peruvian Primera División 0–2 away loss at Cienciano.

Lobos BUAP
On 22 July 2017 Aquino made his Liga MX debut against Santos Laguna playing 76 minutes in the 2-2 draw.

Club León 
He signed for Club Léon in June 2018.  He made his debut on 21 July 2018 against Tigres UANL.

Club América 
On 1 January 2021, Aquino signed for Liga MX side Club América on a permanent deal from Club León. Aquino has been a regular and reliable player for America throughout his time there.

International career
He made his debut for the senior national team on 1 September 2016 in a 0–2 loss to Bolivia in the 2018 World Cup qualifying round.

In May 2018, he was named in Peru’s provisional 24 man squad for the 2018 World Cup in Russia. Aquino started Peru’s second match of the World Cup against France, playing well and hitting the crossbar with a powerful, curving shot from long distance.

Career statistics

International
Statistics accurate as of match played 16 November 2021

International goals
Scores and results list Peru's goal tally first.

Honours
León
Liga MX: Guardianes 2020

Individual
Liga MX All-Star: 2021

References

External links
 
 
 

Peruvian footballers
1995 births
Living people
Footballers at the 2015 Pan American Games
2018 FIFA World Cup players
Peru international footballers
Peru youth international footballers
Peru under-20 international footballers
Sporting Cristal footballers
C.F. Monterrey players
Club León footballers
Club América footballers
Peruvian expatriate footballers
Expatriate footballers in Mexico
Peruvian expatriate sportspeople in Mexico
Peruvian Primera División players
Liga MX players
Footballers from Lima
Association football midfielders
Pan American Games competitors for Peru
Peruvian people of Quechua descent
21st-century Peruvian people